Karen Suzanne Wolstenholme (born 16 October 1962) is a British diplomat who was Ambassador to the Democratic People's Republic of Korea (North Korea) 2011–12.

Born in Hammersmith, Wolstenholme was educated at Penrhos College and joined the Foreign and Commonwealth Office (FCO) in 1980. She served in Moscow, Düsseldorf, Dublin, Harare, Brussels and Wellington before being posted to The Hague in 2007 as deputy UK Permanent Representative to the Organisation for the Prohibition of Chemical Weapons. She gained a Master of Public Administration degree from the Open University in 2010. She was appointed to be Ambassador to North Korea in 2010 and took up the post in September 2011. She was replaced as Ambassador to North Korea in October 2012 by Michael Gifford. Her husband, Jonathan Wolstenholme, Her Majesty's Consul to Cuba, died in 2011 due to diabetic ketoacidosis.

References

1962 births
Living people
People educated at Rydal Penrhos
Alumni of the Open University
Ambassadors of the United Kingdom to North Korea
British women ambassadors